Kun may refer to:

People with the surname 
 András Kun, Franciscan priest
 Béla Kun, Hungarian communist politician
 Éva Kun, Hungarian fencer
 Kun Can, Chinese painter
 Roland Kun, Nauruan politician
 Ruben Kun, President of Nauru (1996–1997)
 Russ Kun, President of Nauru (2022–)
 Russell Kun, Nauruan politician

People with the given name or nickname 
 Cai Xukun, Chinese singer, debut from idol producer on the 6th April 2018
 Cao Kun (1862–1938), President of the Republic of China
 Chen Kun, Chinese actor and singer
 Chen Kun (baseball), Chinese baseball player
 Chunyu Kun, Confucian philosopher and official 
 Feng Kun, Chinese female volleyball player
 Hu Kun, Chinese violinist and conductor
 Huang Kun, Chinese physicist 
 Jiang Kun (disambiguation), several people
 Kun Agüero, nickname of Argentine footballer Sergio Agüero
 Kun Yang, Chinese physicist
 Lee Kwan or Li Kun, Chinese actor
 Li Kun, Chinese footballer
 Lu Kun (1772–1835), Chinese Qing Dynasty official
 Wang Kun (disambiguation), several people
 Yang Kun, Chinese singer-songwriter
 Zhao Kun, Chinese swimmer

Other uses 
 Kun (鯤) and Peng, two forms of a creature from Chinese mythology
 Kunqu or Kun Opera, a Chinese opera genre
 kun (君), a Japanese honorific
 Kun (Islamic term) (كن), meaning manifesting, existing or being
 Kaunas Airport, Lithuania, IATA code
 Kun Peak, in the Nun Kun mountain massif, Ladakh, India
 Kun'yomi, reading of Japanese Kanji characters

See also 
 Kuns, a Nomadic group in Eurasia
 Khun (disambiguation)